Pantopsalis albipalpis is a species of harvestman in the genus Pantopsalis. It was first described by Reginald Innes Pocock in  a paper published in 1902. P. albipalpis cannot be distinguished from P. johnsi but P. johnsi has not been synonymised as these species each have a distinct distribution.

References

Taxa named by R. I. Pocock
Arachnids of New Zealand
Harvestmen
Endemic fauna of New Zealand
Endemic arthropods of New Zealand